Gastrochilus inconspicuus is a species of orchid. It is native to the Himalayas of Nepal, India, Bhutan, Sikkim, and Assam, south to Bangladesh.

References 

inconspicuus
Orchids of India
Orchids of Nepal
Orchids of Bangladesh
Flora of Assam (region)
Flora of East Himalaya
Flora of West Himalaya
Plants described in 1890